E. James "Jim" Ladwig (born April 13, 1938) is a retired American politician and businessman.  He was a member of the Wisconsin State Assembly for twelve years. A Republican, he represented Caledonia, Wisconsin, and northern Racine County.

Early life and career
Ladwig was born on April 13, 1938, in Milwaukee, Wisconsin. He graduated from Riverside University High School and the University of Wisconsin-Madison. Ladwig served in the United States Army, worked as a high school teacher, and later became an investment broker.

Political career
Ladwig was first elected to the Assembly in 1978, defeating incumbent Democrat Marcel Dandeneau. Additionally, he was Supervisor of the Town of Caledonia, Wisconsin, from 1971 to 1973 and Member of the Racine County Board of Supervisors from 1974 to 1978.

Personal life and family
Ladwig is married to Bonnie Ladwig, who ultimately succeeded him after his retirement from the Wisconsin Assembly.  They have three children.  Their son Jim was Racine County Executive from 2011 to 2014.

References

External links
 

Politicians from Milwaukee
Politicians from Racine, Wisconsin
County supervisors in Wisconsin
Republican Party members of the Wisconsin State Assembly
Military personnel from Milwaukee
United States Army soldiers
University of Wisconsin–Madison alumni
1938 births
Living people